MŽRKL League for the season 2013–14 was the Thirteenth season of the Adriatic League. Competition included twelve teams from five countries, a champion for the first time in team history became the Radivoj Korać. In this season participating clubs from Serbia, Montenegro, Bosnia and Herzegovina, Croatia and from Slovenia.

MŽRKL League for the season 2013–14 has begun to play 9 October 2013. and ended on 26 February 2014, when he it was completed a Quarterfinals. Final Four to be played from 7–8 March 2014. in Podgorica, Montenegro. Winner Final Four this season for the team Radivoj Korać from Serbia.

As a Cadet MŽRKL League last season a success, the Board of league decided to continue playing Cadet MŽRKL League. Cadet MŽRKL League comprises 9 teams, where each team plays each at once. One team is organizing a mini tournament where four teams play two rounds of the league for a weekend and so once a month. Top 4 teams qualify for the Final Four to be played in the same place for seniors and the same weekend play. Winner Final Four this season for the second time in team history became the team Trešnjevka 2009 from Croatia.

Team information

Regular season
In the Regular season was played with 12 teams divided into 2 groups of 6 teams and play a dual circuit system, each with one game each at home and away.  The four best teams in each group at the end of the regular season were placed in the Quarterfinals. The regular season began on 9 October 2013. and it will end on 6 February 2014.

Group A

Group B

Quarterfinals
In the quarterfinals, teams play until one team arrives first to 2 wins. The winners were placed on the Final Four. The quarterfinals began on 12 February 2014. and it will end on 27 February 2014.

Final four
Final Four to be played from 7–8 March 2014. in the Morača Sports Center in Podgorica, Montenegro.

Awards
Player of the Year: Tavelyn James (170-PG-90) of Athlete Celje 
Guard of the Year: Tavelyn James (170-PG-90) of Athlete Celje 
Forward of the Year: Aleksandra Crvendakić (188-F-96) of Crvena zvezda 
Center of the Year: Marica Gajić (187-C-95) of Athlete Celje 
Defensive Player of the Year: Haleigh Lankster (175-G-89) of Budućnost Volcano 
Coach of the Year: Miloš Pavlović of Radivoj Korać 

1st Team
PG: Aleksandra Stanaćev (167-PG-94) of Crvena zvezda 
PG: Tavelyn James (170-PG-90) of Athlete Celje 
F: Aleksandra Crvendakić (188-F-96) (183-90) of Crvena zvezda 
PF: Marica Gajić (187-C-95) of Athlete Celje 
C: Tina Jovanović (190-F/C-91) of Crvena zvezda 

2nd Team
PG: Milica Deura (178-G-94) of Crvena zvezda 
G: Sanja Mandić (178-SG-85) of Radivoj Korać 
GF: Jelena Vučetić (178-G-93) of Partizan 
F: Haleigh Lankster (175-G-89) of Budućnost Volcano 
C: Ana Radović (190-C-90) of Budućnost Volcano 

Honorable Mention
Eva Lisec (192-C-95) of Athlete Celje 
Ivanka Matić (193-C/F-79) of Crvena zvezda 
Tina Jakovina (183-F-92) of Triglav Kranj 
Nina Premasunac (186-F-92) of Medveščak 
Monet Johnson (186-F-87) of Play Off Sarejevo 
Aida Kalušić (190-C-87) of Čelik Zenica 
Zvjezdana Gagić (170-PG-81) of Čelik Zenica

External links
 2013–14 MŽRKL at eurobasket.com
 2013–14 MŽRKL - Group A at srbijasport.net
 2013–14 MŽRKL - Group B at srbijasport.net

2013-14
2013–14 in European women's basketball leagues
2013–14 in Serbian basketball
2013–14 in Bosnia and Herzegovina basketball
2013–14 in Montenegrin basketball
2013–14 in Croatian basketball
2013–14 in Slovenian basketball